Eudonia furva is a moth in the family Crambidae. It was described by Wei-Chun Li, Hou-Hun Li and Matthias Nuss in 2012. It is found in Yunnan, China.

The length of the forewings is 7.5–8 mm. The forewings are covered with dense black scales. The antemedian, postmedian and subterminal lines are white. The hindwings are white, the apex suffused with pale brown scales.

Etymology
The species name refers to the parts of the forewings that are covered with black scales and is derived from Latin furvus (meaning jet black).

References

Moths described in 2012
Eudonia